Aeonium leucoblepharum is a succulent flowering plant in the family Crassulaceae.  The pointed leaves have a strong central stripe, and they may develops pinkish colour on exposure to strong sunlight. There are variants with less pointed leaves but still with the central stripe. The flowers are yellow, 7- to 10-merous, with petals 6 – 8 x 1.8 – 2.5 mm. The species is native to mountains in Yemen and north-eastern Africa, from Ethiopia and Somalia to Kenya and Uganda. 
It is also known as Sempervivum leucoblepharum and Sempervivum chrysanthum.

References

leucoblepharum